Drylands are defined by a scarcity of water. Drylands are zones where precipitation is balanced by evaporation from surfaces and by transpiration by plants (evapotranspiration). The United Nations Environment Program defines drylands as tropical and temperate areas with an aridity index of less than 0.65. One can classify drylands  into four sub-types:

 Dry sub-humid lands
 Demi-arid lands
 Arid lands
 Hyper-arid lands

Some authorities regard hyper-arid lands as deserts (United Nations Convention to Combat Desertification - UNCCD) although a number of the world's deserts include both hyper-arid and arid climate zones. The UNCCD excludes hyper-arid zones from its definition of drylands.

Drylands cover 41.3% of the earth's land surface, including 15% of Latin America, 66% of Africa, 40% of Asia, and 24% of Europe. There is a significantly greater proportion of drylands in developing countries (72%), and the proportion increases with aridity: almost 100% of all hyper-arid lands are in the developing world. Nevertheless, the United States, Australia, and several countries in Southern Europe also contain significant dryland areas.

Drylands are complex, evolving structures whose characteristics and dynamic properties depend on many interrelated interactions between climate, soil, and vegetation.

Biodiversity 
The livelihoods of millions of people in developing countries depend highly on dryland biodiversity to ensure their food security and their well-being. Drylands, unlike more humid biomes, rely mostly on above ground water runoff for redistribution of water, and almost all their water redistribution occurs on the surface. Dryland inhabitants' lifestyle provides global environmental benefits which contribute to halt climate change, such as carbon sequestration and species conservation. Dryland biodiversity is equally of central importance as to ensuring sustainable development, along with providing significant global economic values through the provision of ecosystem services and biodiversity products. The UN Conference on Sustainable Development Rio+20, held in Brazil in June 2012, stressed the intrinsic value of biological diversity and recognized the severity of global biodiversity loss and degradation of ecosystems.

Drylands in East Africa 

The East African drylands cover about 47% of land areas and are home to around 20 million people. Pastoralists who rely on cattle for both economic and social well-being constitute the majority of rural inhabitants in the drylands. Pastoralists use strategic movement to gain access to pasture during the dry season using resources effectively However, due to a variety of factors, this method has changed and been constrained.  Challenges connected to demographics and climate change. Drylands occupy around 2 million km2 or respectively 90%, 75%, and 67% of Kenya, Tanzania, and Ethiopia respectively. The low level of precipitation and the high degree of variability limit the possibilities for rainfed crop production. More than 60 million people, or 40% of these countries’ population, live in drylands.

The four sub-types

Dry and sub-humid lands 

Countries like Burkina Faso, Botswana, Iraq, Kazakhstan, Turkmenistan and the Republic of Moldova, are 99% covered in areas of dry and sub-humid lands. The biodiversity of dry and sub-humid lands allows them to adapt to the unpredictable rainfall patterns that lead to floods and droughts. These areas produce the vast amount the world's crops and livestock. Even further than producing the vast majority of crops in the world, it is also significant because it includes many different biomes.    Biomes include:

 Grassland
 Savannahs
Mediterranean climate

Semi-arid lands
Semi-arid lands can be found in several regions of the world. For instance in places such as Europe, Mexico, Southwestern parts of the U.S, Countries in Africa that are just above the equator, and several Southern countries in Asia.

Definition of semi-arid lands 
According to literature, arid and semi-arid lands are defined based on the characteristics of the climate. For instance, Mongi et al. (2010) consider semi-arid lands as places where the annual rainfall ranges between 500 and 800mm. Fabricius et al. on the other hand insist that the concept of aridity should also include conditions of aridity and semi-aridity. Furthermore, he considers that a huge part of the Sub-Saharan area covering around 40 countries on the continent is land having arid conditions. Arid and semi-arid lands have high evaporation for all required conditions high air temperature mainly during dry seasons, high and almost continuous isolation through the year, and the presence of dry gale-force winds.

Manifestations of Climate Change in semi-arid lands 
Based on spatial repartition of greenhouse gas emissions (GGE) in the atmosphere, it seems that Africa contributes marginally in comparison to the rest of the world. Africa generates on average less than 4% of GGE produced in the world. Comparative data on GGE per person show that Europeans and Americans generate about 50 to 100 times more gas than Africans (Thiam, 2009). Based on the consequences caused by variability and climate change, it appears that African populations are more vulnerable than others. To illustrate, the trend of reduced rainfall in the Sahel area has been marked by climatic extremes with devastating consequences on natural resources, agricultural and pastoral activities, etc. In semi-arid lands, manifestations of climate change on communities and socio-economic activities are more diversified.

The characterization and impact of the variability trend of rainfall depend on several random factors. Among the random factors, we can mention, the nature and the critical thresholds of extreme events, the frequency of these extremes according to regions, the precision of data used, and the results of mathematical simulations, and propagation. The state of scientific knowledge has allowed for the identification of the principal manifestations of climate change on the development of socio-economic activities in semi-arid lands. These manifestations are:

 Increased variability of precipitations and their characteristics (number of rainfall days, date of start, length of the season) that can be translated to an abrupt alternative between dry and humid years.
 a shorter rainy season correlatively to its late start;
an increase in the occurrence of dry sequences that can happen at any time in space and time during the actual period;
 a tendency to the increment of maximal rains cumulated in fewer consecutive days, that causes damage and important loss on socio-economic systems (culture, infrastructure) and humans;

Dry and violent winds associated with very scarce rainfall that prevent enough humidification of the soils; making difficult the development of the whole vegetal life;
 The actual rise without compromise of observed temperatures according to forecasts of the GIEC creates stressful thermal situations that may seriously handicap vegetal and animal productivity.

Adaptation, Resilience in SALS 
In semi-arid lands where pastoralism is the principal activity, the main adaptation measures are an early departure to transhumance, the reduction of the size of the herd, a change in the management of water, and diversification of paths of transhumance. This allows breeders to safeguard their livestock and prevent huge losses as was the case in the drought of the seventies. Breeders purchase stock for the livestock or simply stock it. They become proactive (trade, real estate, guarding, transport) in certain countries like Burkina Faso, Senegal, Mali, and Kenya. These adaptation strategies allow them to be more resilient to climate change

Arid lands. 

Arid lands make up about 41% of the world's land and are home to 20% of the world's people. They have several characteristics that make them unique :

 Rainfall scarcity
 High temperatures
 Evapotranspiration  Low humidity

Hyper-arid lands 
These lands cover 4.2% of the world  and consist of areas without vegetation. They receive irregular rainfall that barely surpasses 100 millimeters, and in some cases, they may not receive rainfall for several years.

See also 
 Arid Lands Information Network
 Desert
 Dryland farming

References 

Biomes